Monument of Neutrality is a monument originally located in Ashgabat, Turkmenistan. In 2010, it was moved to the suburbs.
It cost $12 million to construct. The arch was located in central Ashgabat where it dominated the skyline, being taller than the nearby Presidential Palace. The statue was illuminated at night. The arch featured a panoramic viewing platform which was a popular attraction for visitors.

Removal

On 18 January 2010 Nyýazow's successor as president, Gurbanguly Berdimuhamedow, signed a decree to begin work on dismantling and moving the arch. There were reports that the arch would be dismantled as early as 2008, but the president did not approve the move until 2010. The dismantling was officially said to be a move to improve urban design in Ashgabat but is seen as part of Berdimuhamedow's campaign to remove the excesses of the personality cult that Nyýazow had created in his two decades at the head of one of the world's most totalitarian regimes.

Berdimuhamedow moved the "Monument to Neutrality" to the suburbs. The president appointed Turkish construction firm Polimeks, which had initially constructed it, to carry out the dismantling and movement of the arch. The removal of Nyýazow's golden statue was completed on 26 August 2010,
although it was then placed back after the monument was moved. The statue no longer rotates, but the viewing platform is still usually open for visitors. There are elevators inside the "legs" of the monument.

Symbol of the country

See also
 De-Stalinization

References

External links

 The Neutrality Monument – Polimeks

Buildings and structures in Ashgabat
Buildings and structures completed in 1998
Monuments and memorials in Turkmenistan
Saparmyrat Nyýazow
1998 establishments in Turkmenistan